Sandra Schultz Newman (born November 4, 1938) is a former justice of the Pennsylvania Supreme Court.

Career
Schultz Newman was the first female Assistant District Attorney in the Montgomery County, and is licensed to practice in Pennsylvania and New York. She was first elected to the Pennsylvania Commonwealth Court in 1993. In 1995, she was elected to the State Supreme Court, becoming the court's first female justice. Since retiring at the end of 2006, she has maintained a private law practice in Alternative Dispute Resolution. She also prepares lawyers for mock appellate arguments.

She currently has taken on the cause for Israel and is an ardent supporter of the Republican party.

Recognitions
Schultz Newman has received the Medallion of Achievement Award from Villanova University School of Law, the Anne X. Alpern Award from the Pennsylvania Bar Association, and four Honorary Doctorate Degrees. She is also a recipient of the Drexel 100 Award, recognizing her as one of Drexel University's 100 outstanding alumni, and she has been designated a Distinguished Daughter of Pennsylvania. She was one of the founders of the new Drexel University College of Law, and serves on its Board of Overseers, and she has been on the executive board of Trustees of Drexel's College of Medicine since 2002.

References

External links

Justices of the Supreme Court of Pennsylvania
Living people
American women judges
Drexel University alumni
Temple University alumni
Villanova University School of Law alumni
1938 births
21st-century American women
Pennsylvania Republicans